is a Japanese judoka.

Fujita is from Goshogawara, Aomori. He began judo at the junior high school days and won gold medal at World Junior Championships in 1994, World University Championships in 1996, East Asian Games in 1997, and so on.

After graduation from Tokai University, He belonged to Asahi Kasei.

Fujita retired in 2000.

References

Japanese male judoka
People from Goshogawara
Sportspeople from Aomori Prefecture
1976 births
Living people
Tokai University alumni